Ochlerotatus stimulans is also known by the synonym Aedes stimulans and the common name, woodland mosquito.

References

External links 
 Ochlerotatus stimulans Bugguide, Photos
  Ochlerotatus stimulans GeoSpecies Knowledge Base University of Wisconsin, Photos
  Aedes stimulans Iowa-Mosquito.net Iowa State University, Collection Data

Insects described in 1848
Ochlerotatus